Harrison Mixbus is a digital audio workstation (DAW) available for Microsoft Windows, Mac OS X and Linux operating systems and version 1 was released in 2009.

Mixbus provides a modern DAW model incorporating a "traditional" analog mixing workflow. It includes built in proprietary analog modeled processing, based on Harrison's 32-series and MR-series analog music consoles.

Mixbus is based on Ardour, the open source DAW, but is sold and marketed commercially by Harrison Audio Consoles.

Features of Mixbus

Mixbus provides the features of Ardour, with additional functionality from proprietary DSP, replicating the workflow, signal path and sound of a Harrison console.

Each channel strip in Mixbus features analog modeled 3 band EQ (including a high pass filter), compression (with 3 compressor types), panning, and summing.

It includes 8 stereo mixbuses featuring tone controls, tape saturation, compression (including a sidechain compressor).

The master bus is similar to the mixbuses but has the additions of a limiter, a K14 meter for loudness monitoring and a stereo correlation meter.

Mixbus started out as an audio only workstation. In earlier versions, it also depended on the JACK audio server as its backend. Since version 3, Mixbus supports both audio and MIDI tracks and it no longer depends on JACK, although JACK can still be used as one of its audio backends.

See also
 List of MIDI editors and sequencers

References

Audio editing software for Linux
Linux
Digital audio editors for Linux
Digital audio recording
Digital audio workstation software
Linux software
MacOS audio editors